Ensygnia is a UK-based technology company. They aggregate across identity management, mobile payments and cyber security acting as an interaction gateway. Ensygnia's primary product is Onescan, a transaction and identity management platform.

History

Ensygnia operations began in 2012. In 2013 the company secured $3.3 million in seed funding and successfully applied for and received two UK patents. Ensygnia was also one of 17 start-ups accepted into the London-based Telefonica funded Wayra Academy for the year 2013. At the end of 2013, Ensygnia acquired Mustard Digital and its retail site Snaptaps.

In 2014, Ensygnia won 'Best Software Solution' at the Mobile Industry Awards, reached the final on the Innotribe start-up challenge and became a start-up in residence at BBC labs.

In June 2015, Ensygnia was listed as one of the best funded (B2B) Commerce Enablers in Europe.

See also
 Computer security
 Mobile payments
 Identity management

References

Financial services companies established in 2012
Mobile payments
Electronic funds transfer
Information technology companies of the United Kingdom
Security companies of the United Kingdom
Financial technology companies